Ohrožený druh (Threatened Species) is a compilation album by Czech recording artist Michal Horáček, released on Sony BMG in 2008.

Track listing 

Notes
 All songs performed in Czech with exception of "Esik az eső, csendesen", sung partly in Hungarian.
 A  Denotes a cover version of the Paolo Conte's song, originally composed for Tu mi turbi (1983), a movie by Roberto Benigni.
 B  Denotes a cover version of the Tanita Tikaram's song "Twist in My Sobriety", originally released on her studio album Ancient Heart (1988).

Credits and personnel

 Michal Horáček - lyrics, producer
 Hana Robinson - music, lead vocal
 Paolo Conte - music, lyrics
 Milan Vyskočáni - music
 Ivan Hlas - music
 František Černý - music, lead vocal
 Karel Holas - music
 Petr Hapka - music
 Tanita Tikaram - music, lyrics

 Jarda Svoboda - lyrics
 Natálie Kocábová - lead vocal
 Lenka Nová - lead vocal
 Naďa Válová - lead vocal
 Szidi Tobias - lead vocal
 Richard Krajčo - lead vocal
 Tereza Nekudová -lead vocal
 Věra Nerušilová - lead vocal
 Matěj Ruppert - back vocal
 Milan Kymlicka - arranger

Charts and certifications

Weekly charts

Sales certifications

Notes
 A  Ohrožený druh became the best-selling album of a music band in the Czech Republic with the sale of 22,766 copies. As of 2011, its total sale reached 35,000 units.

Awards

Notes
 B  The rest of nominees included Kryštof v opeře album by Kryštof group, Yvonne Sanchez's album My Garden and the self-titled album by Toxique band.

References

External links 
 Ohrožený druh (official website)
 MichalHoracek.cz > Discography > Ohrožený druh

2008 compilation albums